August Ferdinand Anacker (17 October 1790 – 21 August 1854) was a German composer.

Anacker, the son of a poor shoemaker, was born in Freiberg, Saxony.  He attended the Gymnasium in Freiberg before going to Leipzig in 1813 to study music with Johann Gottfried Schicht and Friedrich Schneider.  In 1822, he became a cantor and conductor in his hometown, where he distinguished himself as a teacher and composer, establishing and managing a number of musical institutions in a career spanning several decades.  He died in Freiberg.

Of his many compositions for voice and instrumental accompaniment, the cantata Der Bergmannsgruß enjoyed the greatest popularity.  He also wrote a notable piece for 13 Russian horns.

External links

1790 births
1854 deaths
German Romantic composers
German conductors (music)
German male conductors (music)
19th-century classical composers
German male classical composers
19th-century German composers
19th-century German male musicians